Nubian architecture is diverse and ancient.  Permanent villages have been found in Nubia, which date from 6000 BC. These villages were roughly contemporary with the walled town of Jericho in Palestine.

Early Period

The earliest Nubian architecture used perishable materials, wattle and daub, mudbricks, animal hide, and other light and supple materials. Early Nubian architecture consisted of speos, structures derived from the carving of rock, an innovation of the A-Group culture (c. 3800-3100 BCE), as seen in the Sofala Cave rock-cut temple. Ancient Egyptians made widespread use of speos during the New Kingdom of Egypt.

Two types of A-Group graves exist.

The A-Group culture vanished, followed later by the C-Group culture (2400–1550 BCE). Settlements consisted of round structures with stone floors. Structural frame was achieved with wooden or pliant materials. Mudbricks became the preferred building 1094B.C.E materials as settlements became larger. Graves were circular cylindrical superstructures made of stoned wall. The pit was filled with gravel and stones, and covered with dried mud roof or hay roof. Later, during the Second Intermediate Period of Egypt (circa 1650 to 1550 BCE), an adobe chapel was placed to the north of the grave. Graves were from El Ghaba, Kadero, Sayala, and various other sites in northern Sudan.

Kerma

The C-Group culture was related to the Kerma Culture. Kerma was settled around 2400 BCE. It was a walled city containing a religious building, large circular dwelling, a palace, and well laid out roads. On the East side of the city, a funerary temple and chapel were laid out. It supported a population of 10,000 at its height in 1700 BCE. One of its most enduring structures was the deffufa, a mud-brick temple where ceremonies were performed on top.

The deffufa is a unique structure in Nubian architecture. Three known deffufas exist: the Western Deffufa at Kerma, an Eastern Deffufa, and a third, little-known deffufa. It was surrounded by a boundary wall. Inside were chambers connected by passageways.

The Eastern Deffufa is shorter than the Western Deffufa, just two stories high. It is considered a funerary chapel, being surrounded by 30,000 tumuli or graves. It has two columned halls. The walls are decorated with portraiture of animal in color schemes of red, blue, yellow, and black and stone-laid floors. Exterior walls were layered with stone. The third deffufa is of similar structure as the Eastern Deffufa.

The Kerma graves are distinct. They are circular pits covered with white or black pebbles in a circular mound. Four huge graves in the southern part of the site exist. They lie in rows surrounded by smaller graves. Underneath exists a complex structure. A pathway running along the diameter is laid with mud walls, supporting the above mound. The mud walls seemed to have been once decorated. The pathway goes to a chamber with a Nubian vault and a wooden door where the king is buried. The king's bed is elaborate with stone-carved legs. The vaulted chamber lies in the center of the structure. It is estimated 300 humans and 1000 cattle were probably sacrificed with the king to accompany him in the after-life.

Kush and Napata

Between 1500–1085 BCE, Egyptian conquest and domination of Nubia was achieved. This conquest brought about the Napatan Phase of Nubian history, the birth of the Kingdom of Kush. Kush was immensely influenced by Egypt and eventually conquered it. During this phase we see the building of numerous pyramids and temples.

Of much spiritual significance to Nubian pharaohs was Jebel Barkal. Nubian pharaohs received legitimacy from the site. They held pharaonic coronation and consulted its oracle. It was thought to be the dwelling place of the deity Amun. Temples for Mut, Hathor, and Bes are also present. Thirteen temples and three palaces have been excavated.

The city of Napata has not been fully excavated. Some of the temples were started by various pharaohs and were added on by succeeding pharaohs, beginning with Egyptian pharaohs. Reisner excavated Jebel Barkal, labeling its monuments B for Barkal. Some are as follows: B200 (temple of Taharqa), B300 (Taharqa's other temple of Mut, Hathor and Bes), B500 (temple of Amun), B501 (outer court), B502 (hypostyle hall), B700 (temple), B800sub (temple of Alara of Nubia), B1200 (palace). Psamtik II of the Twenty-sixth Dynasty of Egypt sacked the region in 593 BCE, destroying all Nubian statues in B500.

Nubian pyramids were constructed on three major sites: El-Kurru, Nuri, and Meroë. More pyramids were constructed and for the longest time in Nubia than in Egypt. Nubia contains 223 pyramids. They were smaller than Egyptian pyramids. Nubian pyramids were for kings and queens. The general construction of Nubian pyramids consisted of steep walls, a chapel facing East, stairway facing East, and a chamber access via the stairway.

El-Kurru was the first major site. It was made of sandstone. About ten pharaohs and fourteen queens were buried at El-Kurru.

Nuri was another important pyramid site, 6 miles northeast of Jebel Barkal. It housed the tombs of twenty pharaohs and fifty four queens. The tombs were cut out of bedrock. The pharaoh's chamber contained three interconnecting chambers. The queen's contain two interconnecting chambers.

Meroë
The third Nubian Pyramid site, Meroë, is considered the largest archaeological site in the world. It contains more Nubian Pyramids than any other site.

The ancient Nubians established a system of geometry including early versions of sun clocks. Many are located at the sites of Meroë. During the Meroitic period in Nubian history the ancient Nubians used a trigonometric methodology similar to the Egyptians.

Christian Nubia

The Christianization of Nubia began in the 6th century AD. Its most representative architecture are churches. They are based on Byzantium basilicas. The structures are relatively small and made of mudbricks. The church is rectangular in shape with North and South isles. Columns are used to divide the nave. On the East side is the apse. The altar stood in front of the apse. The area between the altar and apse was called the haikal. At the West was a tower or upper room also in the South corner and North corner. Doors were in the North and South  walls. A few churches such as Faras Cathedral survived. Church painting with biblical themes were extensive but few survived. The best surviving church painting were on the Rivergate Church of Faras and the Church of Ab El Qadir.

Vernacular architecture of the Christian period is scarce. Architecture of Soba is the only one that has been excavated . The structures are of sun dried bricks, same as present day Sudan, except for an arch.

One prominent feature of Nubian churches are vaults made out of mudbricks. The mudbrick structure was revived by Egyptian architect Hassan Fathy after rediscovering the technique in the Nubian village of Abu al-Riche. The technology is advocated by environmentalist as environmentally friendly and sustainable, since it makes use of pure earth without the need of timber.

Islamic Nubia

The conversion to Islam was a slow, gradual process, with almost 600 years of resistance. Most of the architecture of the period are mosques built of mudbricks. One of the first attempt at conquest was by Egyptian-Nubian, Ibn Abi Sarh. Ibn Abi Sarh  was a Muslim leader who tried to conquer all Nubia in the 8th century AD. It was almost a complete failure. A treaty called the Baqt shaped Egyptian-Nubian relations for six centuries and permitted the construction of a mosque in the Nubian capital of Old Dongola for Muslim travelers. By the middle of the 14th century, Nubia had been converted to Islam. The royal Church of Dongola was converted into a mosque. Numerous other churches were converted to mosque.

Graves were simple pits, with bodies pointing to Mecca. Some of the unique structures were the gubbas, graves reserved for Muslim saints. They were whitewashed domes made of adobe bricks.

References

External links
Temples of Gebel Barkal
Medieval Nubia
Churches in Lower Nubia

 
Architecture
Architecture in Egypt
Architecture in Sudan